Acrojana is a genus of moths in the family Eupterotidae.

Species
 Acrojana rosacea Butler, 1874
 Acrojana salmonea Rothschild, 1932
 Acrojana sciron Druce, 1887
 Acrojana scutaea Strand, 1909
 Acrojana simillima Rothschild, 1932
 Acrojana splendida Rothschild, 1917

References

Janinae
Macrolepidoptera genera